Eros Dacaj (born 9 September 1996) is a German professional footballer who plays as a midfielder for  club SV Elversberg.

Club career
Dacaj joined the youth academy of Eintracht Braunschweig in 2012 from JFV Northeim. In 2017, he was promoted to the club's senior side in the 2. Bundesliga. He made his professional debut on 18 August 2017, in a league match against FC Erzgebirge Aue. In summer 2018 he joined SV Rödinghausen.

International career
In August 2016, Dacaj was invited to a training camp of the Kosovo under-21 team.

References

External links
 

1996 births
Living people
People from Northeim
Footballers from Lower Saxony
German people of Kosovan descent
German footballers
Kosovan footballers
Association football midfielders
Eintracht Braunschweig II players
Eintracht Braunschweig players
SV Rödinghausen players
SV Elversberg players
Regionalliga players
2. Bundesliga players